In enzymology, an adenylyl-sulfate kinase is an enzyme that catalyzes the chemical reaction

ATP + adenylyl sulfate  ADP + 3'-phosphoadenylyl sulfate

Thus, the two substrates of this enzyme are ATP and adenylyl sulfate, whereas its two products are ADP and 3'-phosphoadenylyl sulfate.

This enzyme belongs to the family of transferases, specifically those transferring phosphorus-containing groups (phosphotransferases) with an alcohol group as acceptor.  The systematic name of this enzyme class is ATP:adenylyl-sulfate 3'-phosphotransferase. Other names in common use include adenylylsulfate kinase (phosphorylating), 5'-phosphoadenosine sulfate kinase, adenosine 5'-phosphosulfate kinase, adenosine phosphosulfate kinase, adenosine phosphosulfokinase, adenosine-5'-phosphosulfate-3'-phosphokinase, and APS kinase.  This enzyme participates in 3 metabolic pathways: purine metabolism, selenoamino acid metabolism, and sulfur metabolism.

This enzyme contains an ATP binding P-loop motif.

Structural studies

References

Further reading
 
 
 

Protein domains
EC 2.7.1
Enzymes of known structure